Amazon Quest is a 1949 American adventure film directed by Steve Sekely and written by Al Martin. The film stars Tom Neal, Carole Mathews, Carole Donne, Don Zelaya, Ralph Graves, Joseph Crehan, Jack George, Joseph Granby, Edward Clark and Julian Rivero. The film was released on May 13, 1949, by Film Classics.

Plot

Cast          
Tom Neal as Thomas Dekker Jr.
Carole Mathews as Theresa Vasco
Carole Donne as Anna Narden
Don Zelaya as José Lobato
Ralph Graves as Anna's Attorney
Joseph Crehan as De Ruyter
Jack George as Judge
Joseph Granby as Mariano 
Edward Clark as Nicholas Handel
Julian Rivero as Vasco
Lester Sharpe as Clerk
Zacharias Yaconelli as Clerk 
Don Dillaway as Guide
Cosmo Sardo as Ringleader
Paul Fierro as Lieutenant
Frank Lackteen as Native Chief

References

External links
 

1949 films
American adventure films
1949 adventure films
Film Classics films
Films directed by Steve Sekely
American black-and-white films
1940s English-language films
1940s American films